Pilar Barreiro Álvarez (born 24 November 1955, in Lugo, Spain) is a Spanish politician who belongs to the People's Party (PP).

Married with two children, Barreiro graduated in law. She joined the Popular Alliance in 1987 and this became the current PP in 1989. She was elected to the Murcian Regional Assembly in 1991 and served a four-year term. In 1995 she became the first female Mayor of Cartagena and has remained Mayor since then.

In 2008, she was chosen to head the PP list for the Spanish Congress of Deputies for Murcia region and the list obtained the highest vote share of all districts for any party.

In 2017, she is accused of embezzlement, corruption, and disclosure of confidential information.

References

External links
Biography at Spanish Congress site

1955 births
Living people
People from Lugo
Members of the 9th Congress of Deputies (Spain)
People's Party (Spain) politicians
21st-century Spanish women politicians